Běhařov is a municipality and village in Klatovy District in the Plzeň Region of the Czech Republic. It has about 200 inhabitants.

Administrative parts
The village of Úborsko is an administrative part of Běhařov.

Gallery

References

Villages in Klatovy District